Gunnar Ström (born 7 October 1930) is a Swedish speed skater. He competed at the 1952 Winter Olympics and the 1956 Winter Olympics.

References

External links
 

1930 births
Living people
Swedish male speed skaters
Olympic speed skaters of Sweden
Speed skaters at the 1952 Winter Olympics
Speed skaters at the 1956 Winter Olympics
People from Eskilstuna
Sportspeople from Södermanland County
20th-century Swedish people